FC Schalke 04 II are the reserve team of German association football club FC Schalke 04. Until 2005 the team played as FC Schalke 04 Amateure.

The team has qualified for the first round of the DFB-Pokal, the German Cup, on two occasions. They currently play in the tier four Regionalliga West.

History
The team first made an appearance in the highest football league in Westphalia when it won promotion to the tier three Verbandsliga Westfalen in 1964 but was relegated again in 1966. It made a return to the league in 1978 when the Oberliga Westfalen was established as the tier above the Verbandsliga but was once more relegated in 1980. It returned to the league for a third time in 1986 and played there until 1992 when a division championship took the team up to the Oberliga Westfalen.

The team played for three seasons against relegation in the Oberliga until 1995, when it dropped back to the Verbandsliga. It returned to the Oberliga again in 1997, now as a much stronger side. A league championship in the Oberliga earned the club promotion to the Regionalliga Nord in 2003 but it was relegated again immediately. Four more Oberliga seasons followed until 2008 when the team qualified for the new Regionalliga West where it has played since.

The team has played in the DFB-Pokal twice, qualifying for the first round in 1994–95 and 2001–02, going out to VfL Wolfsburg in 1994 and VfL Bochum in 2001.

Honours
The team's honours:
Oberliga Westfalen
 Champions: 2003, 2019
 Runners-up: (6) 1998, 1999, 2000, 2002, 2007, 2008
Westfalenliga
 Champions: 1992, 1997
Westphalia Cup
 Runners-up: 1994, 2001

Recent seasons 
The recent season-by-season performance of the club:

 With the introduction of the Regionalligas in 1994 and the 3. Liga in 2008 as the new third tier, below the 2. Bundesliga, all leagues below dropped one tier. In 2000 all clubs from the disbanded Regionalliga West/Südwest from North Rhine-Westphalia joint the Regionalliga Nord, in 2008 these clubs left the league again to join the new Regionalliga West.

Stadium
Since the 2020–21 season FC Schalke 04 II play at the Parkstadion Gelsenkirchen.

Players

Current squad

Current technical staff

Managers since 1992

 Klaus Fischer (1992–1995)
 Klaus Täuber (1995–2002)
 Gerhard Kleppinger (2002–2005)
 Mike Büskens (2005–2008)
 Sven Kmetsch (2008)
 Markus Högner (2008–2009)
 Oliver Ruhnert (2009–2010)
 Michael Boris (2010–2011)
 AR Murugadoss (2011-2012)
 Bernhard Trares (2011–2014)
 Jürgen Luginger (2014–2017)
 Onur Cinel (2017–2018)
 Torsten Fröhling (2018–)

References

External links
 Official club website  
 FC Schalke 04 II at Weltfussball.de 

North Rhine-Westphalia reserve football teams
German reserve football teams
FC Schalke 04
Premier League International Cup